The Dunedin Formation is a geologic formation in British Columbia. It preserves fossils dating back to the Devonian period.

See also

 List of fossiliferous stratigraphic units in British Columbia

References
 

Devonian British Columbia
Devonian southern paleotropical deposits